The 1997–98 Scottish Football League Third Division was the 4th season in the format of ten teams in the fourth-tier of Scottish football since it was re-established in 1994–95. The season started on 5 August 1997 and ended on 9 May 1998. Alloa Athletic finished top and were promoted alongside runners-up Arbroath. Dumbarton finished bottom.

Teams for 1997–98

Inverness Caledonian Thistle as champions of the previous season were directly promoted to the 1997–98 Scottish Second Division alongside runners-up Forfar Athletic. They were replaced by Dumbarton and Berwick Rangers who finished second bottom and bottom of the 1996–97 Scottish Second Division respectively.

Overview
Relegated from Second Division to the Third Division
 Dumbarton
 Berwick Rangers

Promoted from Third Division to the Second Division
 Inverness Caledonian Thistle
 Forfar Athletic

Stadia and locations

Table

Statistics

Top scorers

References

External links 
Official site
1997/1998 Scottish Third Division at Soccerway
Scottish Football Archive

Scottish Third Division seasons
Scot
4